The Whitby Warriors are a Junior "A" box lacrosse team from Whitby, Ontario, Canada.  The Warriors play in the OLA Junior A Lacrosse League.

History
The Whitby Jr Lacrosse Franchise began in 1969 as the Whitby B & R Transporters. The Transporters won the Castrol Cup in 1970 as Canadian Jr B Champions. The Castrol Cup gave way to the Founders Cup in 1972. Whitby B & R Transporters won their 2nd Canadian Jr B Championship Founders Cup in 1974.
In 1975, Whitby Warriors came into the OLA Jr A League. The franchise has won the Minto Cup 7-times starting in 1980 known as Whitby C. B. C. Builders. The franchise was known as Whitby First City for 1982 & 1983. Named Whitby Warriors at start of 1984 season. Since then the Warriors have won Minto Cups in 1984, 1985, 1997, 1999, 2011 and 2013.

*2012 Season: The Ontario Lacrosse League implements a goals for/goals against ruling when two teams are tied with the same number of points at the end of the season, AND the two teams have split the outcomes of their own games equally. Whitby was outscored by Six Nations 2 goals between their two games, hence giving Six Nations the 1st place seed in the tie-break and overall OLA-A standings.

*2015 Season:  The Whitby Warriors update their team logo.  The primary reason for the logo change is that the general manager of the Warriors felt the "logo was very similar to an NBA logo (Golden State Warriors) ..."

Season-by-season results
Note: GP = Games played, W = Wins, L = Losses, T = Ties, Pts = Points, GF = Goals for, GA = Goals against

Whitby natives and Warrior alumni in the NLL
Zack Greer Duke University (National Freshman of the year), Edmonton Rush
John LaFontaine, Edmonton Rush Brooklin Redmen
Gavin Prout, Colorado Mammoth (team captain '06) Brooklin Redmen
Chris Corbeil, Edmonton Rush (team captain '12) Brooklin Redmen
Cameron Holding, Colorado Mammoth
Mark Matthews, Edmonton Rush
Curtis Knight team captain 2012 and 13  [Guelph] [Edmonton Rush] Brooklin Redmen
Mike Lum-Walker, Toronto Rock
Emerson Clark, Toronto Rock
Adrian Sorichetti, Edmonton Rush Brooklin Redmen
Jason Crosbie, Toronto Rock Brooklin Redmen
Alexis Buque, Colorado Mammoth

References

External links
Warriors Webpage
OLA Junior 'A' Lacrosse Site

Ontario Lacrosse Association teams
Sport in Whitby, Ontario
Lacrosse teams in Ontario